This is a list of Israeli football transfers for the 2015 Summer Transfer Window

Ligat Ha'Al

Beitar Jerusalem

In:

Out:

Bnei Sakhnin

In:

Out:

Bnei Yehuda

In:

Out:

Hapoel Acre

In:

Out:

Hapoel Be'er Sheva

In:

Out:

Hapoel Haifa

In:

Out:

Hapoel Ironi Kiryat Shmona

In:

Out:

Hapoel Kfar Saba

In:

Out:

Hapoel Ra'anana

In:

Out:

Hapoel Tel Aviv

In:

Out:

Maccabi Haifa

In:

Out:

Maccabi Petah Tikva

In:

Out:

Maccabi Netanya

In:

Out:

Maccabi Tel Aviv

In:

Out:

References

2015
Israel
Transfers